A golden triangle, also called a sublime triangle, is an isosceles triangle in which the duplicated side is in the golden ratio  to the base side:

Angles
 The vertex angle is:

Hence the golden triangle is an acute (isosceles) triangle.

 Since the angles of a triangle sum to  radians, each of the base angles (CBX and CXB) is:

Note:

 The golden triangle is uniquely identified as the only triangle to have its three angles in the ratio 1 : 2 : 2 (36°, 72°, 72°).

In other geometric figures
 Golden triangles can be found in the spikes of regular pentagrams.
 Golden triangles can also be found in a regular decagon, an equiangular and equilateral ten-sided polygon, by connecting any two adjacent vertices to the center. This is because: 180(10−2)/10 = 144° is the interior angle, and bisecting it through the vertex to the center: 144/2 = 72°.
 Also, golden triangles are found in the nets of several stellations of dodecahedrons and icosahedrons.

Logarithmic spiral

The golden triangle is used to form some points of a logarithmic spiral. By bisecting one of the base angles, a new point is created that in turn, makes another golden triangle. The bisection process can be continued indefinitely, creating an infinite number of golden triangles. A logarithmic spiral can be drawn through the vertices. This spiral is also known as an equiangular spiral, a term coined by René Descartes. "If a straight line is drawn from the pole to any point on the curve, it cuts the curve at precisely the same angle," hence equiangular.

Golden gnomon

Closely related to the golden triangle is the golden gnomon, which is the isosceles triangle in which the ratio of the equal side lengths to the base length is the reciprocal  of the golden ratio .

"The golden triangle has a ratio of base length to side length equal to the golden section φ, whereas the golden gnomon has the ratio of side length to base length equal to the golden section φ."

Angles
(The distances AX and CX are both a′ = a = φ , and the distance AC is b′ = φ², as seen in the figure.)
 The apex angle AXC is:

Hence the golden gnomon is an obtuse (isosceles) triangle.

Note: 

 Since the angles of the triangle AXC sum to  radians, each of the base angles CAX and ACX is:

Note: 

 The golden gnomon is uniquely identified as a triangle having its three angles in the ratio 1 : 1 : 3 (36°, 36°, 108°). Its base angles are 36° each, which is the same as the apex of the golden triangle.

Bisections
 By bisecting one of its base angles, a golden triangle can be subdivided into a golden triangle and a golden gnomon.
 By trisecting its apex angle, a golden gnomon can be subdivided into a golden triangle and a golden gnomon.
 A golden gnomon and a golden triangle with their equal sides matching each other in length, are also referred to as the obtuse and acute Robinson triangles.

Tilings
 A golden triangle and two golden gnomons tile a regular pentagon.
 These isosceles triangles can be used to produce Penrose tilings. Penrose tiles are made from kites and darts. A kite is made from two golden triangles, and a dart is made from two gnomons.

See also
 Golden rectangle
 Golden rhombus
 Kepler triangle
 Kimberling's golden triangle
 Lute of Pythagoras
 Pentagram
 Golden triangle (composition)

References

External links
 
 
 Robinson triangles at Tilings Encyclopedia
 Golden triangle according to Euclid
 The extraordinary reciprocity of golden triangles at Tartapelago by Giorgio Pietrocola

Types of triangles
Golden ratio